Left Over Life To Kill is both an EP and an album released by the Australian band The Paradise Motel, released in 1996 and 1997 respectively. Lyrics and most music was written by Charles Bickford with arrangements by Matt Aulich.

EP
The EP was released by Mushroom Records in Australia in 1997 on both CD and 10-inch vinyl.

The EP reached number 2 on the Australian Alternative Charts and became the third highest selling alternative release of 1996.

Track listing

This was soon followed by a remix EP, entitled 'Some Deaths Take Forever', which consisted of experimental remixes of tracks and outtakes from Left Over Life To Kill, an interpretation of The Triffids' song Raining Pleasure and was also produced by the band themselves. 2,000 hand-numbered copies were produced and soon sold out. These and many subsequent releases by The Paradise Motel were noted for their stylistic uniformity, reminiscent of Penguin Books' Penguin Classics series.

LP
Also released on Mushroom/Infectious this release accompanied the band's relocation to the UK the following year. It contains four songs from their earlier EP (Please Keep Me Safe), Ashes from their first EP and five songs from their Australian album Still Life. Following positive praise from the UK press, the band accompanied its release with a promotional tour of mainland Europe and the UK.

Track listing

External links
Official Band Website
Paradise Motel on MySpace
Paradise Motel discography

References

1996 EPs
1997 albums
The Paradise Motel albums
Mushroom Records albums